The Eilenberg–Niven theorem is a theorem that generalizes the fundamental theorem of algebra to quaternionic polynomials, that is, polynomials with quaternion coefficients and variables. It is due to Samuel Eilenberg and Ivan M. Niven.

Statement 
Let 

 

where x, a0, a1, ... , an are non-zero quaternions and φ(x) is a finite sum of monomials similar to the first term but with degree less than n. Then P(x) has at least one solution.

Generalizations 
Eilenberg–Niven theorem can also be generalized to octonions: all octonionic polynomials with a unique monomial of higher degree have at least one solution, independent of the order of the parenthesis (the octonions are a non-associative algebra). Different from quaternions, however, the monic and non-monic octonionic polynomials do not have always the same set of zeros.

References 

Theorems about polynomials